The Portfolio Committee on Police is a portfolio committee of the National Assembly in the Parliament of South Africa.

As of July 2019, Tina Joemat-Pettersson of the African National Congress serves as chair of the committee.

Mandate
The committee oversees the Department of Police and the South African Police Service (SAPS) and other statutory entities, including the Independent Police Investigative Directorate (IPID), the Civilian Secretariat for Police Service, the Private Security Industry Regulatory Authority (PSIRA), the National Forensic Oversight and Ethics Board (DNA Board), and the Office of the DPCI Judge.

Membership

The following MPs serve as alternate members:
Princess Faku MP  (African National Congress)
Mandla Galo MP (African Independent Congress)
Tim Mashele MP (African National Congress)
Kenneth Meshoe MP (African Christian Democratic Party)
Munzoor Shaik Emam MP (National Freedom Party)
Henry Shembeni MP (Economic Freedom Fighters)

See also
Committees of the Parliament of South Africa

References

Committees of the National Assembly of South Africa